Campofelice di Roccella (Sicilian: Campufilici di Ruccedda) is a comune (municipality) in the Metropolitan City of Palermo in the Italian region of Sicily, located about  southeast of Palermo.

Campofelice di Roccella borders the following municipalities: Collesano, Lascari, Termini Imerese.

Demographic evolution

References

External links
 www.comune.campofelicediroccella.pa.it/
 www.campofeliceroccella.it/

Municipalities of the Metropolitan City of Palermo